Caripeta macularia is a species of moth in the family Geometridae first described by William Barnes and James Halliday McDunnough in 1916. It is found in North America.

The MONA or Hodges number for Caripeta macularia is 6874.

References

Further reading

External links

 

Ourapterygini
Articles created by Qbugbot
Moths described in 1916